Amazon Digital Software & Video Games is a digital video game distribution service owned by the international electronic commerce company Amazon.com. 

The service was launched on 3 February 2009, as Amazon Digital Game Store, having 600+ game titles available for download at that time.

On 7 August 2013, it was launched in the United Kingdom.

On 12 November 2013, Amazon launched a digital PlayStation store. Those who own a PS3, PS Vita or PS4 game from Amazon and receive a code for use over the PlayStation Network.

References

External links
Video Games US
Video Games UK
Gaming Resources

Digital Game Store
Online-only retailers of video games